Rodolivos is a town and a former municipality in the Serres regional unit, Greece. Since the 2011 local government reform it is part of the municipality Amfipoli, of which it is the seat and a municipal unit. The municipal unit has an area of 106.034 km2. It is about 30 km from Drama. Its population was 2,611 in 2001. The village is at the foot of Mount Pangaio.

Just next to Rodolivos, namely on the hill of "St. Athanasius" and also in the neighboring place "Kouria", are attested traces of two ancient settlements of Edonida (Greek: Ηδωνίδα), which were located on the via Egnatia. In these sites were found some inscriptions of imperial times (2nd-3rd AD).

Subdivisions
The municipal unit Rodolivos is subdivided into the following communities (population in 2011 in square brackets):
Rodolivos [ 2072 ]
Domiros [ 154 ]
Mikro Souli [ 385 ]

See also
List of settlements in the Serres regional unit

References

Populated places in Serres (regional unit)
Archaeological sites in Macedonia (Greece)
Macedonia (Greece)

bg:Радолиово (дем)
mk:Радолиово